Midwinter is the middle of the winter. The term is attested in the early Germanic calendars.

Attestations
Midwinter is attested in the early Germanic calendars, where it appears to have been a specific day or a number of days during the winter half of the year. Before the adoption of the church calendar, the date of midwinter may have varied due to the use of a lunisolar calendar, or it may have been based on a week system tied to the astronomical winter solstice. In the medieval Icelandic calendar it was the first day of Þorri, the fourth winter month, which corresponds to the middle of January in the Gregorian calendar. According to Snorri Sturluson's Heimskringla ( 1230), the pre-Christian holiday Yule was originally celebrated at midwinter, but in the 10th century, the king Haakon the Good moved it to the same day as Christmas, about three weeks earlier.

Beginning in the 18th century, the term midwinter has sometimes been misunderstood as synonymous with the winter solstice.

See also
 First day of summer (Iceland)
 Midsummer
 Midwinter Day

References

Citations

Sources

Further reading
 

Winter
January observances
Early Germanic calendar